Almazbek Sharshen uluu Atambayev (born 17 September 1956) is a Kyrgyz politician who served as the President of Kyrgyzstan from 1 December 2011 to 24 November 2017. He was Prime Minister of Kyrgyzstan from 17 December 2010 to 1 December 2011, and from 29 March 2007 to 28 November 2007. He served as Chairman of the Social Democratic Party of Kyrgyzstan (SDPK) from 30 July 1999 to 23 September 2011.

In August 2019, Atambayev was imprisoned, facing charges of corruption and manslaughter. On 5 October 2020, election protestors freed him from prison. After a failed assassination attempt, however, he was imprisoned again on 10 October.

Personal life 

Almazbek Atambaev was born in 1956 in the Northern region of Chüy. His father, Sharshen Atambayev, was a veteran of World War II (Great Patriotic War) who served with the Red Army on the front lines in Eastern Europe. Atambaev received his degree in economics while studying at the Moscow Institute of Management. He has four children from his marriage to his first wife Buazhar. In 1988 he married his second wife, Raisa, with whom he has six children: daughters Aliya (born 1997), Diana, and Dinara, and sons Seyit, Seytek, and Khadyrbek (born 1993). Raisa is an ethnic Tatar, born in Osh. She is a doctor.

In January 2018, he published a song he authored called "Kyrgyzstan", which was later rewritten by Azerbaijani performer Araz Elses.

Political career under Akayev and Bakiyev
Atambayev was an unsuccessful candidate in the October 2000 presidential election, receiving 6% of the vote. He served as the Minister of Industry, Trade and Tourism in the government from 20 December 2005 until he resigned on 21 April 2006.

In November 2006 he was one of the leaders of anti-government protests in Bishkek, under the umbrella of the movement 'For Reform!' (За Реформы). He was also involved in earlier protests in late April 2006.

On 26 December 2006 Atambayev rejected calls from other lawmakers for a dissolution of the Supreme Council, saying, "It is impossible for this Parliament to be dissolved at least until May [2007], and it has to adopt all the laws. Otherwise there will be a war in Kyrgyzstan, because even if Parliament adopts the [proposed] authoritarian constitution, I will tell you openly, we will not accept it. It would be a constitution adopted illegally. Then we would take every [possible protest action]. We are ready for that."

Following the resignation of Prime Minister Azim Isabekov on 29 March 2007, Atambayev was appointed acting Prime Minister by President Kurmanbek Bakiyev. He was then confirmed in parliament by a vote of 48–3 on 30 March. He is the first prime minister in Central Asia to come from an opposition party. On 11 April, he tried to address a large protest in Bishkek demanding Bakiyev's resignation, but was booed by the protesters.

Bakiyev announced the resignation of Atambayev's government on 24 October 2007, following a constitutional referendum. The government was to remain in office until after a parliamentary election in December. Nonetheless, Atambayev resigned on 28 November 2007; Bakiyev accepted the resignation, while praising Atambayev for his performance in office, and appointed Acting First Deputy Prime Minister Iskenderbek Aidaraliyev in his place as Acting Prime Minister. Edil Baisalov of the Social Democratic Party claimed that Atambayev was forced out of office because he was an obstacle to alleged government interference in the parliamentary election.

Assassination attempts 
During the period of work (March 2007 – November 2007) as the Prime Minister of the Kyrgyz Republic, an assassination attempt on 11th of May 2007 through poisoning was made on Almazbek Atambaev. As Turkish doctors from the military medical hospital in Ankara later confirmed, the poisoning was caused by a poison of unknown origin. Almazbek Atambayev suggested: "I probably have many enemies now. There are many offended, apparently. Because of my attempts to nationalize the Kristall semiconductor materials plant, they threaten me with physical violence." Assumptions were made that people from the presidential administration could be involved in the poisoning of Atambayev - the president's son and big businessman Maxim Bakiyev and the president's brother Janysh Bakiyev, who served as deputy chairman of the State Committee

In the presidential elections in July 2009, where Atambaev was an only candidate from united opposition bloc, Almazbek Atambaev was again poisoned on the eve of a meeting with voters in the Bazarkorgon district of the Jalalabad region. After breakfast at a local hotel, the single opposition candidate left for a scheduled meeting with voters, but felt unwell on the way. According to the explanations of the oppositionist, he could not imagine what the illness would lead to, and therefore did not cancel the meeting. But when getting out of the car, Almazbek Atambayev felt a loss of coordination of movements. "He felt terrible, his nails turned brown, he was vomiting and dizzy," - Atambayev's spokesman, Zhomart Saparbayev, said. Atambaev was again undergoing treatment in Turkey.

Kursan Asanov, vice-minister of Internal Affairs and head of Atambaev`s arrest operation, told that during the storm of his residence in August 2019, when more than a thousand of representatives of law enforcement agencies stormed his house in Koy-Tash village,  there was an order "not to take ex-president Atambaev alive". 

During the events of October 2020, during the rally of the united opposition, which was led by Almazbek Atambayev and Omurbek Babanov, the car of Almazbek Atambayev,  was fired upon with bullets.The video of assassination attempt went viral in social networks.

Presidential candidate 
On 20 April 2009, Atambayev was announced as a candidate for the July 2009 presidential elections. But on polling day Atambayev withdrew his candidacy claiming "widespread fraud": "Due to massive, unprecedented violations, we consider these elections illegitimate and a new election should be held".

Political career (2010–2011) 
Following the 2010 parliamentary election, he was chosen to be Prime Minister at the head of a coalition government with his SDPK, Respublika, and Ata-Zhurt (which won a plurality in the election).

Atambayev ran in 2011 to succeed Roza Otunbayeva as President of Kyrgyzstan. On election day, 30 October 2011, he won in a landslide, defeating Adakhan Madumarov from the Butun Kyrgyzstan party and Kamchybek Tashiev from the Ata-Zhurt party with 63% of the vote from about 60% of the eligible Kyrgyz population voting.

Presidency (2011–2017)

Inauguration 
He was inaugurated on 1 December 2011. It took place in the National Philharmonic Hall in Bishkek. The ceremony was attended by the President of Turkey, Abdullah Gul, Prime Minister of Kazakhstan Karim Massimov, Prime Minister of Azerbaijan Artur Rasizade and President of Georgia, Mikheil Saakashvili. The attendance of the head of the Presidential Administration of Russia Sergey Naryshkin and the Head of Chechnya Ramzan Kadyrov was expected, however they could not and instead sent lower level Russian Foreign Ministry officials in their place. During his inaugural speech, he said the following about the future of Kyrgyzstan:

The ceremony budget cost less than half of what was spent for inauguration ceremony of Kurmanbek Bakiev in August 2009, costing about 10 million soms ($217,000 in US Dollars). Unlike the breastplates used for the inaugurations of Akaev, Bakiyev and Otunbayeva, which were framed with diamonds and pearls, the jewelers decided not to use the gems in the 108 centimeter long breastplate as it was considered to be an "imported" element in the national culture.

Opinions on presidential term 
George Soros spoke positively about Almazbek Atambayev, stating that "Kyrgyzstan was lucky to have a non-corrupt president", noting that the coming to power of a person who is not mired in corruption is good for the democratic development of the country. Alexander Soros positively reviewed digitalization efforts of Kyrgyz government in Taza Koom project.

Vladimir Putin characterized Almazbek Atambayev as a person who "keeps his word... It is sometimes difficult to agree on something with him, but if something has already been agreed, he goes to the end in fulfilling the agreements reached."

Domestic policy 
In November 2015, the Ministry of Defense was re-branded as the State Committee for Defense Affairs on Atambayev's orders while transferring authority over the Armed Forces of Kyrgyzstan to the General Staff, with the Chief of the General Staff exercising his/her authority as the paramount leader of the military and the second in command to the president. 

In December 2016, Atambayev signed a decree officially abolishing the use of military courts in Kyrgyzstan. 

Earlier that month, he presided over a constitutional referendum which proposed that the increasing the powers of the Prime Minister and his/her government, as well as reforms to the judicial system. It also established that marriage could be only "between a man and a woman" rather of "between two persons" as laid out by the previous constitution. The changes were approved with a landslide majority of close to 80% of the Kyrgyz population.International experts positively assessed the transition to a parliamentary form of government by constitutional reform, the strengthening of the role of the prime minister and parliament thanks to the constitutional reform, as well as the fact that it was supposed to stabilize the institution of power as opposed to the growing spread of Islamist ideology in the country.

A landmark event during the work of Almazbek Atambayev is also the introduction of biometric passports and a biometric electoral system that ensured the transparency of elections and excluded the possibility for one citizen to vote several times. It became possible to vote only after identifying your fingerprint. During Atambayev's presidency, the country introduced a system of participation in elections based on biometric data, which dramatically increased the transparency of the voting procedure and eliminated many opportunities for falsification. The 2014 law "On Biometric Registration of Citizens of the Kyrgyz Republic" played an important role in the development of the institution of democratic elections.

The final year of Atambayev's presidency was marred by numerous civil and criminal trials against journalists, activists and opposition politicians. In many of those trials, the Prosecutor General's Office of Kyrgyzstan has often acted on Atambayev's behalf to represents his interests.  In many cases they were dictated by the fact that the leadership of Kazakhstan interfered in the electoral process in Kyrgyzstan, especially after president of Kazakhstan met with one of the opposition leaders a month before the elections.

Foreign policy 
In 2011 soon after becoming President, Atambayev travelled to Turkey and signed an agreement with the Turkish President agreeing to increase trade from $300 million in 2011 to $1 billion by 2015, with Turkey also agreeing to attract Turkish investment to Kyrgyzstan to the amount of $450 million within the next few years.

Angela Merkel's visit to Kyrgyzstan in 2015 was the first visit of the Federal Chancellor to this country in the history of the independent Kyrgyz Republic and the first visit of Federal Chancellor of Germany to Central Asian region in history.

Atambaev has announced Kyrgyzstan's entry into the Customs Union, secured the withdrawal of the American military base from the country in 2014, and has spoken of the need for closer economic relations with the Russian Federation, which employs at least 500,000 citizens of Kyrgyzstan; however, he also expressed his wish to achieve greater economic and energy independence from it.

Kyrgyzstan also received GSP+  status with European Union under Almazbek Atambayev in 2015. To retain GSP+ status, Kyrgyzstan must comply with 27 international conventions. 7 of them relate to human rights - protecting the rights of children, eliminating discrimination against women and minorities, protecting freedom of speech, freedom of assembly, the right to a fair trial, ensuring the independence of the judiciary, as well as economic, cultural and social rights.

In early 2012 Atambayev travelled to Moscow, where in his meeting with Medvedev he called for the $15 million owed by Russia to Kyrgyzstan for their use of the Kant airbase.

In 2013, he launched a tirade against the United Kingdom, accusing it undermined democracy by allowing a Bakiyev's son, Maxim to live in London:

In February 2015, tension with Belarus arose over the death of Almanbet Anapiyaev, aged 41, whose death Atambayev blamed solely on former Security Service chief Janish Bakiyev, who was being sheltered in Minsk alongside his father. The Belarusian Foreign Ministry responded by saying that it "makes no sense" to comment on his statement. In May 2015, during a Victory Day meeting of CSTO leaders in Moscow, Atambayev took part in an argument with President Islam Karimov over who was being more patriotic during the 70th anniversary celebrations. Later that year, he met with supreme leader Ayatollah Ali Khamenei in Iran, where he condemned American sanctions on the country, saying to Khamenei that "With its 200-year history, America wants to impose its will on a country like Iran that has a five-thousand-year history and civilization, but this is not possible."

During the Kyrgyz presidential election in 2017, Atambayev accused Kazakhstan of sponsoring Ömürbek Babanov, who was one of the presidential candidates. He also accused Kazakhstan officials for being corrupt by looting the pensioners income. On 9 October 2017, Atambayev announced that he wouldn't attend the CIS heads of state summit in Sochi, which would have required the Kyrgyz leader to meet president of Kazakhstan, Nursultan Nazarbayev. That same month, he visited the Uzbek capital of Tashkent in a breakthrough visit for a Kyrgyz leader.

Post-Presidency (2017–present) 

Since he left office on 24 November 2017 and handed the presidency to his successor and former prime minister Sooronbay Jeenbekov, he has served as head of the SDPK. He has also has used his post presidency to get back in the political arena, most notably by criticizing his successor.  This criticism, which began in the spring of 2018, has mostly revolved around Jeenbekov's criticism of the government corruption that took place under his rule. One of Atambayev's main points of criticism of Jeenbekov is that is that he is a victim of a smear campaign by his former ally and his government, saying the following to the April Television Agency about the Jeenbekov government:

On 17 March, he expressed regret by saying: "I apologize to everyone for bringing this person to power". In June 2019, MPs voted to strip Atambayev of his presidential immunity and called for the pursuit of criminal charges on him. In response, Atambayev told reporters at his residence in Koy-Tash that he would "stand to the end" against the parliament and that he is "not afraid of anything in this world". Since then, he remained in his compound while publicly stating that he has weapons at his disposal to "fight back" if police come. On 3 July, Atambaev left his compound for the first time in weeks to speak at a rally of 1,000 of his supporters who called for all the charges to be dropped. On 24 July, he began a two-day visit to Russia with a delegation from the SDPK after departing on a Sukhoi Superjet 100 at Kant Air Base (operated by the Russian Air Force) at 1:48 pm that day. During the visit, he met with President Vladimir Putin in the Kremlin.

Arrest 
On 7 August 2019, the Special Forces of Kyrgyzstan attacked Atambayev's residence in Bishkek, supposedly based on charges of corruption made against him. As a result of the attack, 36 people were injured and one soldier died. In a meeting of the Security Council, Jeenbekov accused Atambayev of "rudely violating the constitution". A second raid was launched the next day, after which Atambayev surrendered to security forces.

On 13 August, Orozbek Opumbayev, the head of the State Committee of National Security (SCNS), said Atambayev was plotting to topple the government before he was taken into custody. On 23 June 2020, he was sentenced to 11 years in jail for corruption for (according to The Diplomat) "the illegal release of a Chechen criminal in 2013. Atambayev is still on trial for, among other things, his involvement in the death of a special forces officer during the botched 7 August 2019 attempt to detain Atambayev at his compound at Koi-Tash outside the capital. The trial has been largely moved online, given the pandemic, but Atambayev reportedly will not testify. Atambayev's lawyers maintain that the former president is immune from prosecution, given his status as a former president; the Kyrgyz parliament – in which Atambayev's former party, the Social Democratic Party (SDPK) holds the most seats – stripped him of that immunity in 2019."

Kursan Asanov, vice-minister of Internal Affairs and head of Atambaev`s arrest operation, told that during the storm of his residence in August 2019, when more than a thousand of representatives of law enforcement agencies stormed his house in Koy-Tash village,  there was an order "not to take ex-president Atambaev alive".

2020 protests
On 5 October 2020, protests erupted with a crowd of 1,000 people, that grew to at least 5,000 people by evening in Bishkek, the nation's capital, in protest against results and allegations of vote-buying in the October 2020 parliamentary election. In addition, protestors freed Atambayev from prison. On 8 October, Atambayev survived an assassination attempt in Bishkek after the car he was traveling in was shot at. He was imprisoned again on 10 October.

In prison 
On March 23, 2022, Almazbek Atambaev’s spine was damaged as a result of violence by the prison guards, and numerous abrasions and marks of beatings were found on his body, which was confirmed on March 25 by the state National Center for the Prevention of Torture of the Kyrgyz Republic and subsequently by a medical examination at the National Center for Cardiology.

Atambayev was denied not only treatment, but even a serious medical examination. Only after the Secretary General of the Socialist International Luis Ayala made a special visit to Kyrgyzstan in 2022 and a special statement from the Socialist International was issued, Atambaev was briefly placed in a clinic for examination.

International support 
On July 8th of 2022, Council of Socialist International (63 political parties around the world) made a statement, that “the manner in which the former president has been detained, tried and sentenced contravenes his legal and human rights as a defendant, violates the Kyrgyz Code of Criminal Procedure and breaches international judicial norms”. Despite the need for two operations on the esophagus, the need for which was concluded by the state National Center for Cardiology, where Atambayev was examined, to this day these operations have not been carried out. Atambayev was diagnosed with Barrett's esophagus.

Awards 
 Order of Manas (1 December 2011)
 Order of "Danaker" (28 November 2007)
 Order of the Republic of Serbia (Serbia, 2013)
 Presidential Order of Excellence (Georgia, 2013)
 Order of Dostyk I degree (Kazakhstan, 7 November 2014)
Order of Alexander Nevsky (Russia, 17 September 2016)
 Order "Friend of Azerbaijan" (Azerbaijan, 2016)
Hero of the Kyrgyz Republic (2017)

References

|-

|-

|-

1956 births
Kyrgyzstani Sunni Muslims
Living people
People from Chüy Region
Presidents of Kyrgyzstan
Prime Ministers of Kyrgyzstan
Social Democratic Party of Kyrgyzstan politicians
Recipients of the Order of Alexander Nevsky
Recipients of the Presidential Order of Excellence
Heroes of the Kyrgyz Republic
Members of the Supreme Council (Kyrgyzstan)
Heads of government who were later imprisoned
State University of Management alumni
Industry ministers of Kyrgyzstan